The City of Bradford Metropolitan District Council elections were held on Thursday, 3 May 1984, with one third of the council and an extra vacancy in Bradford Moor to be elected. The council remained under no overall control.

Election result

This result had the following consequences for the total number of seats on the council after the elections:

Ward results

References

1984 English local elections
1984
1980s in West Yorkshire
May 1984 events in the United Kingdom